Hard Knocks is the twenty-first and penultimate studio album by Joe Cocker, released on 1 October 2010 by Columbia Records in Europe. It features nine new songs produced by Matt Serletic plus Cocker's version of the Dixie Chicks number "I Hope", which was produced by Tony Brown. Apart from a regular CD release, the album was also released on vinyl.

The album reached number 1 on Billboards Independent Albums chart and number 2 on the same magazine's European Albums chart.

A Limited Live Edition (CD/DVD) version of the album was released in December 2010 in Europe with live tracks off the album recorded at Le Zenith in Paris in 2010.

Track listing
 "Hard Knocks" (Marc Broussard, Maxwell Aaron Ramsey, Shannon Sanders) – 3:24
 "Get On" (Matt Serletic, Danny Myrick, Stephanie Bentley) – 3:28
 "Unforgiven" (Mitch Allan, Kara DioGuardi, Nick Lachey, Dave Hodges) – 4:14
 "The Fall" (Matt Serletic, Danny Myrick, Aimée Proal) – 3:49
 "So It Goes" (Matt Serletic, Jeffrey Steele, Danny Myrick) – 3:21
 "Runaway Train" (Ollie Marland) – 3:27
 "Stay The Same" (Matt Serletic, Danny Myrick, Stephanie Bentley) – 4:39
 "Thankful" (Matt Serletic, Kara DioGuardi) – 3:59
 "So" (Chantal Kreviazuk, Thomas "Tawgs" Salter) – 3:56
 "I Hope" (Keb' Mo', Martie Maguire, Natalie Maines, Emily Robison) – 4:46
 "Forever Changed" – 3:51 – iTunes bonus track

Limited Live Edition additional tracks
 "Hard Knocks" (Marc Broussard, Maxwell Aaron Ramsey, Shannon Sanders)
 "Get On" (Matt Serletic, Danny Myrick, Stephanie Bentley)
 "Unforgiven" (Mitch Allan, Kara DioGuardi, Nick Lachey, Dave Hodges)
 "Thankful" (Matt Serletic, Kara DioGuardi)
 "You Are So Beautiful" (Billy Preston, Bruce Fisher)
 "With a Little Help from My Friends" (John Lennon, Paul McCartney)

Personnel 
 Joe Cocker – lead vocals 
 Jamie Muhoberac – keyboards (1-9)
 Matt Serletic – keyboards (1-9), programming (1-9)
 Steve Nathan – synthesizers (10), Wurlitzer organ (10)
 Ray Parker Jr. – guitar (1-9)
 Tim Pierce – guitar (1, 3, 4, 6, 8, 9)
 Joel Sherear – guitar (2, 5, 7)
 Tom Bukovac – electric guitar (10)
 Kenny Greenberg – electric guitar (10)
 Chris Chaney – bass (1-9)
 Glenn Worf – bass (10)
 Josh Freese – drums  (1-3, 5, 7)
 Matt Chamberlain – drums (4, 9)
 Dorian Crozier – drums (6, 8)
 Cleto Escobedo III – saxophone (1, 2)
 Jeff Babko – trombone (1, 2)
 Ron King – trumpet (1, 2)
 Stevie Blacke – cello (3, 4), viola (3, 4), violin (3, 4)
 Sheree Brown – backing vocals (1-4, 7, 9)
 Mabvuto Carpenter – backing vocals (1-4, 7, 9)
 Robyn Troup – backing vocals (1-4, 7, 9)
 Stephanie Bentley – backing vocals (7)
 Ashley Cleveland – backing vocals (10)
 Kim Keyes – backing vocals (10)
 Judson Spence – backing vocals (10)

Choir on "Thankful"
 Jennifer Bailey
 Mabvuto Carpenter
 Kara DioGuardi
 Erica Dowd
 Dorian Ford
 Nomisha Jackson 
 Renee Jackson
 Robyn Troup
 Niomisha Wilson

Production 
 Matt Serletic – producer (1-9)
 Tony Brown – producer (10)
 Mark Dobson – recording (1-9), Pro Tools editing (1-9)
 Doug Trantow – recording (1-9), Pro Tools editing (1-9)
 Jeff Balding – engineer (10)
 Alex Arias – additional engineer (1-9), assistant engineer (1-9), Pro Tools assistant (1-9)
 Mike Leisz – assistant engineer (1-9)
 Chris Lord-Alge – mixing 
 Andrew Schubert – additional mixing 
 Brad Townsend – additional mixing 
 Keith Armstrong – mix assistant 
 Nik Karpen – mix assistant 
 Bob Ludwig – mastering 
 Ryan Corey – art direction, design 
 Jeri Heiden – art direction, design 
 Olaf Heine – photography

Studios
 Tracks 1-9 recorded at Emblem Studios (Calabasas, California).
 Track 10 recorded at Sound Stage Studios (Nashville, Tennessee).
 All songs mixed at Mix LA (Los Angeles, California).
 Mastered at Gateway Mastering (Portland, Maine).

Charts

Year-end charts

Certifications

Personnel
Joe Cocker – vocals
Ray Parker Jr., Tim Pierce, Joel Shearer, Tom Bukovac, Kenny Greenberg – guitar
Chris Chaney, Glenn Worf – bass guitar
Josh Freese, Dorian Crozier, Matt Chamberlain, Greg Morrow – drums
Jamie Muhoberac – keyboards
Matt Serletic – keyboards, programming
Steve Nathan – synthesizer, Hammond organ, piano
Jeff Babko – trombone
Cleto Escobedo III – saxophone
Ron King – trumpet
Robyn Troup, Sherree Brown, Rich King, Mabvuto Carpenter, Stephanie Bentley, Kim Keys, Ashley Cleveland, Judson Spence – backing vocals
Stevie Blacke – cello, violin, viola

References

2010 albums
Joe Cocker albums
Albums arranged by David Campbell (composer)
Albums produced by Matt Serletic
Columbia Records albums